Jonathan Lester Finlay (born October 16, 1948) is a pediatric neuro-oncologist specializing in the management of children, adolescents and young adults with brain tumors. He is the director of Neuro-oncology at Nationwide Children's Hospital, where he also serves as the Elizabeth and Richard Germain Endowed Chair in Pediatric Cancer. He also is professor of pediatrics at The Ohio State University College of Medicine.

Dr. Finlay's work has been aimed at minimizing the long-term side effects of radiation therapy through his “Head Start” clinical study protocols, now in their fourth iteration, which have demonstrated significantly improved survival and quality of life for pediatric brain tumor patients around the world. The currently accruing Head Start IV protocol, open at over 50 institutions, is studying the feasibility and effectiveness of genomics-based risk stratification.

Biography 
Born in Manchester, England, in 1948, the only son of Minnie and Mark Finlay, Dr. Finlay was educated at Carmel College, Wallingford, and subsequently attended medical school between 1967 and 1973 at Birmingham University, earning a B.Sc. (Hons.) in Biochemistry in 1970 and MB, ChB in 1973. He then undertook internships and residencies in pediatrics in Birmingham (including pediatric oncology under the direction of Dr. Jill Mann). In 1976, his future career path in pediatric oncology was formulated during a senior residency appointment at the Christie Hospital and Holt Radium Institute, Manchester, UK, under the direction of Dr. Patricia Morris-Jones. Between 1976 and 1980, he undertook Fellowship training in Pediatric Immunology (1976-1978) under Dr. Richard Hong and then Pediatric Hematology/Oncology (1978-1980) under Dr. Nasarollah Shahidi, both at the University of Wisconsin-Madison. Between 1980 and 2003, he held faculty positions in Pediatric Oncology at Stanford University (1980-1982), the University of Wisconsin-Madison (1982-1987), the Children’s Hospital of Philadelphia and the University of Pennsylvania (1987-1989), the Memorial Sloan-Kettering Cancer Center and Cornell University (1989-1997) and the Stephen Hassenfeld Children's Blood & Cancer Center at New York University (1997-2003). Additionally, he held the posts of Vice-Chair of the Department of Pediatrics at Memorial Sloan-Kettering Cancer Center, and of Director of the Pediatric Oncology Program at New York University and of the Neuro-oncology Program at the New York University Comprehensive Cancer Center.

Between 2003 and 2014, he served as Director of the Neuro-oncology Program at the Children's Hospital Los Angeles and Professor of Pediatrics at the Keck School of Medicine of University of Southern California. In 2013, he was appointed to the Audrey and Billy Wilder Chair in Neuro-oncology and Director of a new, inter-departmental Neuro-oncology Program at Children's Hospital Los Angeles. In July 2014, he assumed his current position as Professor of Pediatrics at The Ohio State University and Director of Neuro-oncology at Nationwide Children's Hospital in Columbus, Ohio; in 2015, he was appointed to the Elizabeth and Richard Germain Endowed Chair in Pediatric Cancer at Nationwide Children's Hospital, Columbus, Ohio.

Over the last 40 years, he has authored and co-authored more than 350 peer-reviewed publications, review articles and book chapters. Since 1985 he has delivered more than 380 invited lectures globally, mainly on childhood brain tumors.

He has served and continues to serve on the Editorial Boards of several leading medical journals, and on the Advisory Boards and/or as Medical Director of several national and international philanthropic foundations devoted to childhood cancer, and to childhood brain tumors in particular. Between 2006 and 2012, he served as the founding Chair of the international Society of Neuro-oncology's International Outreach Committee, whose goal is to facilitate educational and technological improvements in the management of brain tumors of adults and children in low-income countries.

Awards and honors 
 2001: Society for Neuro-oncology Award for Excellence in Pediatric Cancer Research
 2012: Elected Fellow of the Royal College of Physicians of London (FRCP)
 2012: Society for Neuro-oncology Award for Excellence in Pediatric Cancer Research
 2016: Society for Neuro-oncology of Latin America (SNOLA) International Achievement Award of the Society of Neuro-oncology
 2019: Society for Neuro-oncology Lifetime Achievement Award (the first pediatric subspecialist to receive this award)

Personal life 
He is married to Adriana Maria Finlay of Uberaba, Brazil; they live in Worthington, Ohio, with their three dogs (Boris, a Yorkshire terrier; Zoe, a yellow Labrador; and Tristan, a German shepherd/golden retriever/something-that-drools hybrid). He has a daughter, Anna Victoria Finlay, who lives and works in the world of fashion in New York City. His ‘extramural activities’ include rowing; wine tasting; cooking; movies; opera (from Monteverdi to Tommy (The Who); and the postal history of Lombardy and Venetia from 1815 (the Congress of Vienna) to the unification of Italy in 1871.

References

External links 

 [Author] PubMed Citations

Living people
Stanford University faculty
University of Wisconsin–Madison faculty
1948 births
Ohio State University faculty
University of Pennsylvania faculty